The Parramatta Patriots were one of the eight foundation teams of the now defunct Australian Baseball League. They disbanded after the 1990–91 season due to heavy financial losses and were replaced by the Sydney Blues in the following season.

History

See also 
Sport in Australia
Australian Baseball
Australian Baseball League (1989–1999)

External links
The Australian Baseball League: 1989–1999

Australian Baseball League (1989–1999) teams
Defunct baseball teams in Australia